The Almedalen Week (Almedalsveckan, also known as Politician's Week in Almedalen, Politikerveckan i Almedalen) is an annual event taking place in week 26 in and around Almedalen, a park in the city of Visby on the Swedish island Gotland.

With speeches, seminars and other political activities, it is considered to be the most important forum in Swedish politics. During the week, representatives from the major political parties in Sweden take turns to make speeches in Almedalen.

It has inspired similar events to be held in other countries, like Suomi-Areena in Finland, Arendalsuka in Norway, Arvamusfestival in Estonia and Folkemødet at the island of Bornholm in Denmark.

History 

The origin of the Almedalen Week was the speeches made by Olof Palme during several summers in Almedalen. He was in Visby because he and his family used to spend their summers at Fårö. It started with an improvised gathering that Palme, then education minister and candidate for the position of party leader for the Social Democratic party, and another party leader candidate, Krister Wickman had on 25July 1968. Palme made his speech from the back of a flatbed truck at Kruttornet by the Almedalen park. The audience was a couple of hundred people.

Because of the origin of the Almedalen Week, Almedalen is sometimes nicknamed "Palmedalen".

The first official Almedalen Week took place in 1982, when the Social Democrats started to organise economic seminars. As a response, the other political parties started to take a more active part. The first time all of the major party leaders were present was in 1982.

In the middle of the 1980s, the week almost ceased to be. In the summer following the assassination of Olof Palme in 1986, only the Green Party and the Left Party
were present. The rest of the parties expressed that political speeches in Almedalen were too associated with Palme as a person. Ingvar Carlsson, who became prime minister after Palme's death, said that he chose to hold his speeches at other locations in Visby during the following years out of respect for Palme. He only started speaking in Almedalen after having been persuaded to do so by Palme's widow, Lisbet Palme.

21st century 

In recent years, the event has grown larger, with hordes of journalists, lobbyists, local and national politicians, employees from local, regional and national organisations and representatives of non-governmental organizations all coming to Visby to meet, discuss politics and socialize. As of 2015, it is the biggest and most important forum in Sweden for seminars, debates and political speeches on current social issues. In 2014, 3,513 activities were held, 866 journalists were accredited and over 30,000 participants were at the event. One important factor is that all seminars are free of charge. The absolute majority of them are also open to everybody.

On 6 July 2022, during a speech the psychiatrist Ing-Marie Wieselgren died after being stabbed by a right-wing extremist. The stabbing occurred near to a stage where Centre Party leader Annie Lööf was about to give a press conference. After the fatal stabbing, the perpetrator was apprehended by a pensioner and shortly thereafter arrested by police.
 
The number of activities, participants and journalists covering the week has increased during the years. These are the official numbers:

Organization 

Almedalen Week is an annual event taking place in week 27 in and around Almedalen, a park in the city of Visby. It is coordinated by Gotland Municipality and the cost of the different activities is carried by the organization responsible for it. Each day of the week is dedicated to one of the political parties represented in the Riksdag, on a rotating schedule. In 2011, the number of days were extended to eight since there were then eight parties in the Riksdag. A number of other lobbyists, organizations, companies and representatives from municipalities and countries are also present.

Getting noticed 

With the increasing numbers of activities it has become more difficult for the individual participants to get noticed by spectators and the media. This has resulted in a number of spectacular actions during the years. In 2010, the spokesperson for the Feminist Initiative, Gudrun Schyman, burned SEK 100,000 during a speech about the inequality in wages for men and women. In 2005, actress Kim Anderzon, artist Ernst Billgren, musician Olle Ljungström, among others, declared that a new party, the Kulturpartiet (the Cultural Party), had been created and that they were candidates for the Riksdag.
It was later declared that the party had been an elaborate hoax created by the Riksteatern to raise awareness for cultural issues.

Criticism 

Political scientist Maria Wendt has criticized the Almedalen Week and states that it has clarified how much politics in Sweden have become dependent on media, and now conforms to the terms and tools of the press, TV, radio and websites. Wendt says that whereas earlier media would report what went on in politics, it is presently more common to have debates taking place in the media itself. The language and messages delivered by politicians are conformed to fit in the frames provided by TV and newspapers, making comments short, powerful and lacking in nuances. The Almedalen Week is an event where such shortcomings are becoming more visible, according to Wendt. She suggested that instead of dedicating each day to one of the parties, the days should be used to highlight specific issues.

The event as a liminal phase 

During the Almedalen Week journalists, politicians and lobbyists socialize in a way that under normal circumstances would not be considered correct. This has been compared to a liminal phase, a term used in social anthropology for when normal rules cease to apply for a short while, like during carnivals, after which everything returns to normal. What has previously been taboo, is allowed for a short while.

Similar events in other countries 

Similar events have been held in Finland, Denmark and Norway. The Finnish event is called SuomiAreena, started in 2006 in the city of Pori. The Danish event  was started in 2011, on the Bornholm island. A Norwegian version of the week was held at Eidsvoll. The event was scheduled to take place in Arendal again in 2011, but was postponed because of the 2011 Norway attacks. The event is now back. In 2007, a South Korean delegation came to Visby to study the concept of the Almedalen Week. According to political scientist Yonhyok Choe, the island of Jeju is a likely candidate for the event. In 2013, the Arvamusfestival in Estonia was started.

Quote 
Almedalen Week visitor Dennis Kucinich commented on the event:

In 2014, the Almedalen Week was profiled by the US program Democracy Now!.

Speakers at Almedalen Week 
These are the main speakers since 1968 in chronological order.

Gallery

References

Further reading 
 

Olof Palme
Political congresses
Politics of Sweden
Visby
Political and economic think tanks based in Europe
1968 establishments in Sweden
Recurring events established in 1968